Randy Merrill is an American mastering engineer who has worked with international artists including DAY6, Lady Gaga, Katy Perry, Maroon 5, Harry Styles, One Direction, Adele, Imagine Dragons, Beck, Liam Gallagher, Jonas Brothers, Muse, Cage the Elephant, Maren Morris, Ariana Grande, Mumford & Sons, Paul McCartney, Troye Sivan, Taylor Swift, Lorde, Justin Bieber, Porter Robinson, Ayumi Hamasaki, BUCK-TICK, King Gnu, Little Mix and BTS.

Life and career
Merrill attended Jamestown Community College before graduating from State University of New York at Fredonia with a degree in Sound Recording Technology.   He then became a mastering engineer at Masterdisk in 2008 before moving to Sterling Sound in 2013. At Sterling, Merrill worked alongside Tom Coyne winning four Grammys, including wins for Adele's 25, and Mark Ronson's "Uptown Funk". Merrill's mastering work would go on to win Grammys independently for Beck's Colors, Ariana Grande's Sweetener, Lady Gaga's "Shallow", and Cage the Elephant's Social Cues.

Merrill currently works out of Sterling Sound in Edgewater, New Jersey.

Awards and nominations

Grammy Awards

|-
| rowspan="3" style="text-align:center;"| 2017
| "Hello"
| Record of the Year
| 
|-
| 25
| rowspan="3"| Album of the Year
| 
|-
| Purpose
| 
|-
| style="text-align:center;"| 2018
| Melodrama
| 
|-
| rowspan="2" style="text-align:center;"| 2019
| "Shallow"
| Record of the Year
| 
|-
| Colors
| Best Engineered Album, Non-Classical
| 
|-
| rowspan="2" style="text-align:center;"| 2020
| "7 Rings"
| Record of the Year
| 
|-
| Thank U, Next
| rowspan="2"| Album of the Year
| 
|-
| style="text-align:center;" rowspan="2"| 2021
| folklore
| 
|-
| Hyperspace
| Best Engineered Album, Non-Classical
| 
|-
| style="text-align:center;" rowspan="5"| 2022
| "drivers license"
| rowspan=2| Record of the Year
| 
|-
| "Leave the Door Open"
| 
|-
| MONTERO (The Album)
| rowspan=2| Album of the Year 
| 
|-
| Sour
| 
|-
| Dawn
| Best Engineered Album, Non-Classical
|

Notes and references

External links

Full Discography: Randy Merrill at AllCredits.com
Full Grammy Nomination and Awards List for Randy Merrill
Randy Merrill | Artist | www.grammy.com

Living people
Grammy Award winners
Mastering engineers
Year of birth missing (living people)